Midsummer Madness may refer to:

 Midsummer Madness (record label), a Brazilian independent record label
 Midsummer Madness (1921 film), an American silent drama film
 Midsummer Madness (2007 film), a film telling 6 different stories 
 "Midsummer Madness" (song), a 2018 hip hop song by 88rising